The 2016 Case Western Reserve Spartans football team represented Case Western Reserve University as a member of the Presidents' Athletic Conference (PAC) during the 2016 NCAA Division III football season. The team was coached by 13th-year coach Greg Debeljak and played its home games at DiSanto Field in Cleveland. The Spartans finished second in the PAC with a 7–1 record and tied for first in the University Athletic Association (UAA) with a 2–1 record.

Schedule

References

Case Western Reserve
Case Western Reserve Spartans football seasons
Case Western Reserve Spartans football